The 2022–23 San Jose State Spartans men's basketball team represents San Jose State University in the 2022–23 NCAA Division I men's basketball season. They are led by second-year head coach Tim Miles and played their games at Provident Credit Union Event Center as members of the Mountain West Conference.

Previous season 
The Spartans finished the 2022–22 season 8–23, 1–17 in MWC play to finish in last place. They lost to Fresno State in the first round of the MWC tournament.

Offseason

Departures

Incoming transfers

2022 recruiting class

Roster

Schedule and Results
}}
|-
!colspan=9 style=| Exhibition

|-
!colspan=9 style=| Non-conference regular season

|-
!colspan=9 style=| Mountain West regular season

|-
!colspan=9 style=| Mountain West tournament

|-
!colspan=9 style=| College Basketball Invitational

Source

References

San Jose State Spartans men's basketball seasons
San Jose State
San Jose State
San Jose State
San Jose State